The 2007 Missouri Valley Conference men's basketball tournament, known for sponsorship reasons as the 2007 State Farm Missouri Valley Conference men's basketball tournament, or informally as Arch Madness 2007, is the championship tournament for men's basketball teams of the Missouri Valley Conference.  It was held in St. Louis, Missouri, and Creighton, the champion, received an automatic berth in the 2007 NCAA Men's Division I Basketball Tournament.  The tournament was contested by the men's basketball teams of each of the MVC's 10 schools, with seedings based on regular-season conference records.  The 2007 edition ran from 1 March until 4 March 2007.

Seeds

All Missouri Valley Conference schools played in the tournament.

Bracket

References

External links
Tournament website

2006–07 Missouri Valley Conference men's basketball season
Missouri Valley Conference men's basketball tournament
Missouri Valley Conference Men's Basketball